Mark Lee (born 27 March 1968) is a former professional rugby league footballer who played in the 1980s, 1990s and 2000s.

Playing career

County Cup Final appearances
Mark Lee played  in Salford's 24-18 defeat by Widnes in the 1990 Lancashire County Cup Final during the 1990–91 season at Central Park, Wigan on Saturday 29 September 1990.

References

External links
Profile at saints.org.uk

1968 births
Living people
Blackpool Panthers coaches
Cronulla-Sutherland Sharks players
English rugby league players
London Broncos players
Place of birth missing (living people)
Rugby league five-eighths
Rugby league halfbacks
Rugby league hookers
Rugby league second-rows
Salford Red Devils players
St Helens R.F.C. players
Swinton Lions players
Wales national rugby league team players